Calgary Canucks was a Canadian football team in the Alberta Rugby Football Union. The team played in the 1915, 1919 and 1920 seasons, winning two championships.

ARFU season-by-season

References
CFLdb - Calgary Canucks

Defunct Canadian football teams
Can
1915 establishments in Alberta
Sports clubs established in 1915
1920s disestablishments in Alberta
Sports clubs disestablished in 1920